Adapt-N is a precision nitrogen management solution operated by Agronomic Technology Corp.  It was developed at Cornell University.  It examines soil, weather, crop, field management data to provide an always-on, field-specific nitrogen recommendation that has been shown to improve financial and environmental performance.

Adapt-N simulates the nitrogen cycle, including nitrogen fixation, nitrification and denitrification through a combination of soil, weather, crop and field management modeling.

History
Adapt-N was funded by several foundations, agronomy groups and the USDA, and started development in 2004 through Cornell University, though some of its thirteen underlying model components have been developed and calibrated since the 1980s.  Adapt-N was launched for testing in 2008, field tested with replicated strip trials starting in 2011, and launched commercially on April 1, 2014.  The solution is meant to provide improved nutrient management for farmers applying nitrogen to their crops through more accurate, financially beneficial and measurable outcomes.

The commercial launch was executed by Agronomic Technology Corp (ATC) which is a member of Cornell's McGovern Center.

Agronomic Technology Corporation raised an undisclosed amount of funding in the seed round, consisting of investment by farmers.

In November, 2017, ATC and Adapt-N were acquired by the multinational chemical company Yara International.

Further reading
"Adapt-N tool by Fine Tune Nitrogen", "FineTuneNitrogen.com", 2013
 "A tool for adaptive nitrogen in corn","Cornell.edu", 2014
"New_tool_recommends_n_rates_based_on_real-time_analysis', "AgWeb.com", April 30, 2014
"5 finalists named for $1 million Tulane nitrogen reduction prize", "Nola.com", December 5, 2016
"Taking Nitrogen To The Max", "PrecisionAg.com", January 27, 2017
"Better Nitrogen Management with Software", "Agriculture.com", March 27, 2017

References

Companies based in New York (state)